F2: Chasing the Dream is a documentary series produced by Formula One Management as a result of the success of the related Netflix docuseries, Formula 1: Drive to Survive. The series takes a behind-the-scenes look at the FIA Formula 2 Championship.

The first season covered the 2019 Formula 2 Championship season and was released exclusively on Formula One's own streaming service F1 TV on 2 January 2020. The subsequent second season covered the 2020 Formula 2 Championship season and premiered on 1 February 2021.

Episodes

Season 1 (2020)

Season 2 (2021)

Season 3 (2022)

References

Formula One mass media
2020s American documentary television series
2020 American television series debuts
English-language television shows
2020 in Formula One
2021 in Formula One